Former Parks-Cramer Company Complex is a historic factory complex located at Charlotte, Mecklenburg County, North Carolina. The contributing resources are the Manufacturing Building; Shipping, Receiving, and Pipe Storage building; storage building; and rail spur line and they were developed between 1919 and 1955.  The Manufacturing Building is divided into six sections, and is a large one-story brick building with a flat roof and stepped parapets  It features banks of large, steel-sash factory windows.  The Parks-Cramer facility was one of the region's foremost manufacturers of humidifiers and air-conditioning equipment for the new cotton mills.

It was added to the National Register of Historic Places in 1994.

References

Industrial buildings and structures on the National Register of Historic Places in North Carolina
Industrial buildings completed in 1919
Buildings and structures in Charlotte, North Carolina
National Register of Historic Places in Mecklenburg County, North Carolina